Kenyon Junction was a railway station at Kenyon near Culcheth in Warrington, England. The station was built at the junction of the Liverpool and Manchester Railway and the Kenyon and Leigh Junction Railway. It was situated in the historic county of Lancashire. The station opened in 1830 as Bolton Junction and closed to passengers on 2 January 1961 before closing completely on 1 August 1963. The junction fell out of use when the line serving Leigh was closed in 1969.

History
The station was opened on 15 September 1830 as part of the Liverpool and Manchester Railway. It was originally named Bolton Junction before being renamed Kenyon Junction in June 1843.

The early station was criticised for poor facilities and missed connections and was reconstructed in 1883. The London and North Western Railway's Tyldesley Loopline from Eccles to the junction west of Tyldesley station continued south west to Leigh, Pennington and Kenyon Junction opened in 1864.

The original engine shed closed before 1870. Large sidings accommodated goods and coal traffic from Bag Lane, Westleigh, Bickershaw and Abram Collieries and Jacksons and Speakmans Sidings in Bedford, Greater Manchester, Leigh. There were two signal boxes.
All stations on the line to Bolton closed in 1954.
The stationmaster's house remains in occupation, complete with its own railway bridge to cross the Manchester to Liverpool line, but is not visible from the road.

Potential reopening
In 2001 a proposal to rebuild Kenyon Junction station, which met with much local opposition, was abandoned following the rejection of plans to build a leisure complex in Leigh which the rebuilt station would have served. 
Locals have lobbied to rebuild the station and build a link to Leigh.

In March 2019, Andy Burnham backed plans to reopen the station as a short-term solution to link Leigh to the rail network. The plans are also backed by the Leigh MP James Grundy.

References

Citations

Bibliography

External links
The station's history Disused Stations UK
The station on a 1948 OS Map npe maps
The station on an 1849 OS map National Library of Scotland
The station on an 1892 series OS map overlay National Library of Scotland
The line, stations and mileages railwaycodes

Disused railway stations in Warrington
Former London and North Western Railway stations
Railway stations in Great Britain opened in 1830
Railway stations in Great Britain closed in 1961
1830 establishments in England